The legislative districts of Samar are the representations of the province of Samar in the various national legislatures of the Philippines. The province is currently represented in the lower house of the Congress of the Philippines through its first and second congressional districts.

History 
The former province of Samar was divided into three legislative districts from 1907 until 1965.

Its division into three different provinces was only approved in a plebiscite held together with the general elections on November 19, 1965, as mandated by Republic Act No. 4221, which meant that voters still elected representatives under the old district configuration. After the ratification of RA 4221 the representatives of the second and third districts automatically served as the representatives of the lone districts of Western Samar and Eastern Samar, respectively, while the representative of the first district only served until 1967, when special elections were held to determine the new representative for Northern Samar. In 1969 Western Samar was renamed, and it is just this portion of the original undivided province that now assumes the title Samar.

Samar was part of the representation of Region VIII from 1978 to 1984, and from 1984 to 1986 it elected 2 assemblymen at-large. In 1986 it was redistricted into two legislative districts.

1st District 

City: Calbayog
Municipalities: Almagro, Gandara, Matuginao, Pagsanghan, San Jorge, Santa Margarita, Santo Niño, Tagapul-an, Tarangnan
Population (2020): 338, 230

Notes

1907–1969 
Municipalities: Allen, Bobon, Calbayog (became city 1948), Capul, Catarman, Catubig, Laoang, Lavezares, Mondragon, Oquendo (annexed to Calbayog 1948), Palapag, Pambujan, San Antonio, Tinambacan (Weyler) (re-established 1911, re-annexed to Calbayog 1948), Gamay (established 1947), Las Navas (re-established 1949), San Jose (re-established 1949), San Isidro (established 1954), Lapinig (established 1956), San Roque (established 1959), Mapanas (established 1966), San Vicente (established 1966), Silvino Lobos (established 1967)

Notes

2nd District

City: Catbalogan (became city 2007)
Municipalities: Basey, Calbiga, Daram, Hinabangan, Jiabong, Marabut, Motiong, Paranas (Wright), Pinabacdao, San Jose de Buan, San Sebastian, Santa Rita, Talalora, Villareal, Zumarraga
Population (2020): 454, 593

1907–1969 
Municipalities: Almagro, Basey, Calbiga, Catbalogan, Gandara, Santa Rita, Santo Niño, Tarangnan, Villareal, Wright, Zumarraga, Pinabacdao (re-established 1946), Talalora (established 1947), Hinabangan (established 1948), Jiabong (established 1948), Motiong (established 1948), Marabut (established 1949), Daram (established 1949), San Sebastian (established 1950), San Jose de Buan (established 1968), Matuguinao (established as municipal district 1919)

Notes

3rd District (defunct) 

Municipalities: Balangiga, Borongan, Dolores, Guiuan, Llorente, Oras, San Julian, Sulat, Taft, Salcedo (re-established 1908), Hernani (re-established 1912), Quinapondan (re-established 1946), General MacArthur (established 1947), Mercedes (established 1948), Can-avid (established 1948), San Policarpo (established 1948), Giporlos (established 1949), Arteche (established 1951), Maydolong (established 1951), Balangkayan (established 1959), Lawaan (established 1959), Jipapad (established 1965), Maslog (established as municipal district 1919)

Notes

Lone District (defunct) 

Notes

At-Large (defunct)

1943-1944

1984-1986

See also 
Legislative district of Eastern Samar
Legislative district of Northern Samar

References 

Samar
Politics of Samar (province)